The Climate Change and Air Management Coordination Board is a government agency of the Republic of Turkey, responsible for coordinating policy against air pollution in Turkey and climate change in Turkey; board meetings are chaired by the Minister of Environment and Urban Planning.

Climate change
In 2018 a report outlining carbon market policy options for Turkey was submitted to the board.

Criticism

 the Health Ministry is not actively involved in the permitting of industrial facilities, such as coal-fired power stations, which cause deaths due to air pollution.

Despite the Energy Ministry being represented on the board, in 2018 the European Commission criticised the lack of co-ordination between the climate change policy and energy policy of Turkey.  energy policy still included mining more coal and subsidizing coal-fired power stations. As of 2022 the board's decisions are not binding.

Although the Health and Agriculture Ministries coordinate with each other, there is no formal agreement between Health and Energy or Transport as of 2022.

References

Ministry of Energy and Natural Resources (Turkey)
Turkey